Leonor Rubial Cachorro (6 April 1945 – 21 December 2013) was a Spanish politician from the PSOE (Spanish Socialist Workers' Party). She was a member of the Senate from 2004 to 2011.

References

1945 births
2013 deaths
Spanish Socialist Workers' Party politicians
People from Erandio
Members of the 8th Senate of Spain
21st-century Spanish politicians
21st-century Spanish women politicians
Basque women in politics
Members of the 9th Senate of Spain